This article contains a list of magic tricks. In magic literature, tricks are often called effects. Based on published literature and marketed effects, there are millions of effects; a short performance routine by a single magician may contain dozens of such effects.

Some students of magic strive to refer to effects using a proper name, and also to properly attribute an effect to its creator. For example, consider an effect in which a magician shows four aces, and then the aces turn face up one at a time in a mysterious fashion. This effect, recognized as Twisting the Aces, is attributed to Dai Vernon, and it is based on a false count invented by Alex Elmsley. Some tricks are listed merely with their marketed name (particularly those sold as stand-alone tricks by retail dealers), whereas others are listed by the name given within magic publications.

Magic tricks
Assistant's Revenge
Aztec Lady
Battle of the Barrels
Bill in Lemon
Book test
Bullet Catch
Cabinet Escape
Chinese Linking Rings
Chinese Water Torture Cell
Cut and Restore Rope Trick
David Copperfield's Laser Illusion
Dove Pan
Devil's Torture Chamber
Dismemberment
Drill of Death
Guillotine
Impalement
Indian Rope Trick
Inexhaustible bottle
Several varieties of Levitation
Miser's Dream
Metamorphosis
Needle-through-arm
Origami
Predicament Escape
Quick-change
Radium Girl
Sands of the Nile
Several variations of Sawing a Woman in Half, including the Zig Zag Girl and Mismade Girl
Squeeze Box (as created by André Kole)
Table of Death
Thumper (magic trick)
Wringer

Close-up effects

 Ambitious Card
 Blackstone's Card Trick Without Cards
 Card Warp
 Chink-a-chink
 The Circus Card Trick
 Cups and Balls
 Detachable Thumb
 Floating Match on Card
 French Drop (The Tourniquet)
 Glorpy
 Healed and Sealed
 Hot Foil Trick
 Hummer Card
 Needle Through Thumb
 Retention of Vision Vanish (Pinch Vanish)
 Scotch and Soda
 Snapper (puzzle)
 The Best Coin Fold
 The Four Burglars
 Three Card Monte
 Zarrow Shuffle

Levitations

 Asrah Levitation
 Balducci Levitation
 King Rising Levitation
 David Copperfield's Flying

Utilities/accessories 
Thousands of devices are used by magicians to accomplish their effects. However, most of the devices are never even seen by the audience during the performance of the trick(s). While not generally tricks themselves, some of these devices are very valuable to performers of magic.

Topit
A.R. mini-stage
Funkenring
Gibeciere
Business card production wallet
ITR (invented by James George)
Surya's Device Pro (invented by Surya Kumar and James George)
 Thumb tip
Victorian ring box or Lippincott Box is used for storing small items such as coins that have been marked by a participant in an illusion and later appear inside the locked box

See also
 List of card manipulation techniques

References 

 List
Entertainment lists